Paz! is a 2002 Italian comedy film written and directed by Renato De Maria. Set in  1977 in Bologna, it is based on several comic characters created by Andrea Pazienza.

Cast 

 Claudio Santamaria: Pentothal
 Flavio Pistilli: Massimo Zanardi
 Matteo Taranto: Roberto Colasanti
 Max Mazzotta: Enrico Fiabeschi
 Rosalinda Celentano: Gianna
 Fabrizia Sacchi: Lucilla
 Iaia Forte: Professor Corona
 Cristiano Callegaro: Sergio Petrilli
 Roberto Citran: Professor 
 Giampaolo Morelli: Massimone
 Vittoria Puccini: Mirella
 Antonio Rezza: Sprite	
 Frankie hi-nrg MC: Gangster
 Ricky Memphis: Uomo di Latina
 Giorgio Tirabassi: Freak
 Freak Antoni: Bidello  	 	  	
 Giovanni Lindo Ferretti: Uomo ombra

References

External links

2002 films
Italian comedy films
2002 comedy films
Films based on Italian comics
Films set in 1977
Films set in Emilia-Romagna
Live-action films based on comics
2000s Italian-language films